Synthetic paper is a material made out of synthetic resin which is made to have properties similar to regular paper.

Synthetic paper is usually made out of either biaxially oriented polypropylene (BOPP) or high-density polyethylene (HDPE). The applications include paper for labels (thus that can bond with ink) and non-label paper. The products can be highly water resistant, flexible, durable and tear resistant.

To the polypropylene resin can be added calcium carbonate.

The market for synthetic paper includes packaged food and beverage consumption and cosmetics industries.

Notable manufacturers 
 PPG Industries
 Yupo Corporation
 DuPont
 Seiko Epson Corporation
 AGFA-Gevaert N.V. Corporation
Cosmo Synthetic Paper

References 

 
Chemical industry
Plastics industry
Packaging materials